The Zachariah Ford House is a historic house in rural eastern Stone County, Arkansas. It is located northeast of Pleasant Grove, off County Road 46, on the bluffs overlooking the flood plain of the White River. It is a single-story dogtrot log structure, finished with weatherboard siding and a gable roof that extends over its front porch. It rests on stone piers, and is oriented on a north–south axis. The older of the building's two pens was built about 1856 by Zachariah Ford, and the second pen, breezeway, and roof were built by his son George. The building provides an excellent window into the early evolution of this housing form.

The house was listed on the National Register of Historic Places in 1985.

See also
National Register of Historic Places listings in Stone County, Arkansas

References

Houses on the National Register of Historic Places in Arkansas
Houses completed in 1856
Houses in Stone County, Arkansas
National Register of Historic Places in Stone County, Arkansas